The Red Sea (or ; Coptic: ⲫⲓⲟⲙ ⲛ̀ϩⲁϩ Phiom Enhah or ⲫⲓⲟⲙ ⲛ̀ϣⲁⲣⲓ Phiom ǹšari; Tigrinya: ቀይሕ ባሕሪ Qeyih Bahri) is a seawater inlet of the Indian Ocean, lying between Africa and Asia. Its connection to the ocean is in the south, through the Bab el Mandeb strait and the Gulf of Aden. To its north lie the Sinai Peninsula, the Gulf of Aqaba, and the Gulf of Suez (leading to the Suez Canal). It is underlain by the Red Sea Rift, which is part of the Great Rift Valley.

The Red Sea also has extensive shallow shelves, noted for their marine life and corals. The sea is the habitat of over 1,000 invertebrate species and 200 types of soft and hard coral. It is the world's northernmost tropical sea, and has been designated a Global 200 ecoregion.

Extent
The International Hydrographic Organization defines the limits of the Red Sea as follows:
On the North. The Southern limits of the Gulfs of Suez [A line running from Ràs Muhammed (27°43'N) to the South point of Shadwan Island (34°02'E) and thence Westward on a parallel (27°27'N) to the coast of Africa] and Aqaba [A line running from Ràs al Fasma Southwesterly to Requin Island through Tiran Island to the Southwest point thereof and thence Westward on a parallel (27°54'N) to the coast of the Sinai Peninsula].

On the South. A line joining Husn Murad and Ras Siyyan.

Exclusive economic zone
Exclusive economic zones in Red Sea:

Note: Hala'ib Triangle disputed between Sudan and Egypt and calculated for both.

Names

Red Sea is a direct translation of the Greek Erythra Thalassa. The sea itself was once referred to as the Erythraean Sea by Europeans. As well as Mare Rubrum in Latin (alternatively Sinus Arabicus, literally "Arabian Gulf"), the Romans called it Pontus Herculis (Sea of Hercules). The name of the sea may signify the seasonal blooms of the red-coloured Trichodesmium erythraeum near the water's surface. A theory favored by some modern scholars is that the name red is referring to the direction south, just as the Black Sea's name may refer to north. The basis of this theory is that some Asiatic languages used color words to refer to the cardinal directions. Herodotus on one occasion uses Red Sea and Southern Sea interchangeably.

The name in Hebrew Yam Suph is of biblical origin.
The name in  Phiom Enhah ("Sea of Hah") is connected to Ancient Egyptian root ḥ-ḥ which refers to water and sea (for example the names of the Ogdoad gods Heh and Hauhet).

Historically, it was also known to western geographers as Mare Mecca (Sea of Mecca), and Sinus Arabicus (Gulf of Arabia). Some ancient geographers called the Red Sea the Arabian Gulf or Gulf of Arabia.

The association of the Red Sea with the biblical account of the Israelites crossing the Red Sea is ancient, and was made explicit in the Septuagint translation of the Book of Exodus from Hebrew to Koine Greek in approximately the third century B.C. In that version, the Yam Suph is translated as Erythra Thalassa (Red Sea).

The Red Sea is one of four seas named in English after common color terms – the others being the Black Sea, the White Sea and the Yellow Sea. The direct rendition of the Greek Erythra thalassa in Latin as Mare Erythraeum refers to the north-western part of the Indian Ocean, and also to a region on Mars.

History

Ancient era

The earliest known exploration of the Red Sea was conducted by ancient Egyptians, as they attempted to establish commercial routes to Punt. One such expedition took place around 2500 BC, and another around 1500 BC (by Hatshepsut). Both involved long voyages down the Red Sea. 

The biblical Book of Exodus tells the account of the Israelites' crossing of a body of water, which the Hebrew text calls Yam Suph. Yam Suph was traditionally identified as the Red Sea. Rabbi Saadia Gaon (882‒942), in his Judeo-Arabic translation of the Pentateuch, identifies the crossing place of the Red Sea as Baḥar al-Qulzum, meaning the Gulf of Suez.

 Darius the Great of Persia sent reconnaissance missions to the Red Sea, improving and extending navigation by locating many hazardous rocks and currents. A canal was built between the Nile and the northern end of the Red Sea at Suez. In the late 4th century BC, Alexander the Great sent Greek naval expeditions down the Red Sea to the Indian Ocean. Greek navigators continued to explore and compile data on the Red Sea. Agatharchides collected information about the sea in the 2nd century BC. The Periplus of the Erythraean Sea ("Periplus of the Red Sea"), a Greek periplus written by an unknown author around the 1st century, contains a detailed description of the Red Sea's ports and sea routes. The Periplus also describes how Hippalus first discovered the direct route from the Red Sea to India.

The Red Sea was favored for Roman trade with India starting with the reign of Augustus, when the Roman Empire gained control over the Mediterranean, Egypt, and the northern Red Sea. The route had been used by previous states but grew in the volume of traffic under the Romans. From Indian ports goods from China were introduced to the Roman world. Contact between Rome and China depended on the Red Sea, but the route was broken by the Aksumite Empire around the 3rd century AD.

Middle Ages and modern era
During the Middle Ages, the Red Sea was an important part of the spice trade route. In 1183, Raynald of Châtillon launched a raid down the Red Sea to attack the Muslim pilgrim convoys to Mecca. The possibility that Raynald's fleet might sack the holy cities of Mecca and Medina caused fury throughout the Muslim world. However, it appears that Reynald's target were the lightly armed Muslim pilgrim convoys rather the well guarded cities of Mecca and Medina, and the belief in the Muslim world that Reynald was seeking to sack the holy cities was due to the proximity of those cities to the areas that Raynald raided. 

In 1513, trying to secure that channel to Portugal, Afonso de Albuquerque laid siege to Aden but was forced to retreat. They cruised the Red Sea inside the Bab al-Mandab, as the first fleet from Europe in modern times to have sailed these waters. Later in 1524 the city was delivered to Governor Heitor da Silveira as an agreement for protection from the Ottomans.
In 1798, France ordered General Napoleon to invade Egypt and take control of the Red Sea. Although he failed in his mission, the engineer Jean-Baptiste Lepère, who took part in it, revitalised the plan for a canal which had been envisaged during the reign of the Pharaohs. Several canals were built in ancient times from the Nile to the Red Sea along or near the line of the present Sweet Water Canal, but none lasted for long. The Suez Canal was opened in November 1869. After the Second World War, the Americans and Soviets exerted their influence whilst the volume of oil tanker traffic intensified. However, the Six-Day War culminated in the closure of the Suez Canal from 1967 to 1975. Today, in spite of patrols by the major maritime fleets in the waters of the Red Sea, the Suez Canal has never recovered its supremacy over the Cape route, which is believed to be less vulnerable to piracy.

Oceanography

The Red Sea is between arid land, desert and semi-desert. Reef systems are better developed along the Red Sea mainly because of its greater depths and an efficient water circulation pattern. The Red Sea water mass-exchanges its water with the Arabian Sea, Indian Ocean via the Gulf of Aden. These physical factors reduce the effect of high salinity caused by evaporation in the north and relatively hot water in the south.

The climate of the Red Sea is the result of two monsoon seasons; a northeasterly monsoon and a southwesterly monsoon. Monsoon winds occur because of differential heating between the land and the sea. Very high surface temperatures and high salinities make this one of the warmest and saltiest bodies of seawater in the world. The sea is known for its strong winds and unpredictable local currents.

The rain is mostly short showers, often with thunderstorms and occasionally with dust storms. Favia favus coral there harbours a virus, BA3, which kills T. loyana.
Scientists are investigating the unique properties of these coral and their commensal algae to see if they can be used to salvage bleached coral elsewhere.

Salinity
The Red Sea is one of the saltiest bodies of water in the world, owing to high evaporation and low precipitation; no significant rivers or streams drain into the sea, and its southern connection to the Gulf of Aden, an arm of the Indian Ocean, is narrow. Its salinity ranges from between ~36 ‰ in the southern part and 41 ‰ in the northern part around the Gulf of Suez, with an average of 40 ‰. (Average salinity for the world's seawater is ~35 ‰ on the Practical Salinity Scale, or PSU; that translates to 3.5% of actual dissolved salts).

Tidal range
The central Red Sea (Jeddah area) is therefore almost tideless, and as such the annual water level changes are more significant. Because of the small tidal range the water during high tide inundates the coastal sabkhas as a thin sheet of water up to a few hundred metres rather than flooding the sabkhas through a network of channels. The prevailing north and northeast winds influence the movement of water in the coastal inlets to the adjacent sabkhas, especially during storms. Winter mean sea level is  higher than in summer. Tidal velocities passing through constrictions caused by reefs, sand bars and low islands commonly exceed . Coral reefs in the Red Sea are near Egypt, Eritrea, Israel, Saudi Arabia, and Sudan.

Current
Detailed information regarding current data is lacking, partially because the currents are weak and both spatially and temporally variable. The net value of the latter predominates, resulting in an overall drift to the north end of the Red Sea.

Wind regime
The rest of the Red Sea and the Gulf of Aden are subjected to regular and seasonally reversible winds. The wind regime is characterized by seasonal and regional variations in speed and direction with average speed generally increasing northward.

Wind is the driving force in the Red Sea to transport material as suspension or as bedload. Wind-induced currents play an important role in the Red Sea in resuspending bottom sediments and transferring materials from sites of dumping to sites of burial in quiescent environment of deposition. Wind-generated current measurement is therefore important in order to determine the sediment dispersal pattern and its role in the erosion and accretion of the coastal rock exposure and the submerged coral beds.

Geology

The Red Sea was formed by the Arabian peninsula being split from the Horn of Africa by movement of the Red Sea Rift. This split started in the Eocene and accelerated during the Oligocene. The sea is still widening (in 2005, following a three-week period of tectonic activity it had grown by 8m), and it is considered that it will become an ocean in time (as proposed in the model of John Tuzo Wilson). In 1949, a deep water survey reported anomalously hot brines in the central portion of the Red Sea. Later work in the 1960s confirmed the presence of hot, saline brines and associated metalliferous muds. The hot solutions were emanating from an active subseafloor rift. Lake Asal in Djibouti is eligible as an experimental site to study the evolution of the deep hot brines of the Red Sea. By observing the strontium isotope composition of the Red Sea brines, it is possible to deduce how these salt waters found at the bottom of the Red Sea could have evolved in a similar way to Lake Asal, which ideally represents their compositional extreme. The high salinity of the waters was not hospitable to living organisms.

Sometime during the Tertiary period, the Bab el Mandeb closed and the Red Sea evaporated to an empty hot dry salt-floored sink. Effects causing this would have been:
A "race" between the Red Sea widening and Perim Island erupting filling the Bab el Mandeb with lava.
The lowering of world sea level during the Ice Ages because of much water being locked up in the ice caps.

A number of volcanic islands rise from the center of the sea. Most are dormant. However, in 2007, Jabal al-Tair island in the Bab el Mandeb strait erupted violently. Two new islands were formed in 2011 and 2013 in the Zubair Archipelago, a small chain of islands owned by Yemen. The first island, Sholan Island, emerged in an eruption in December 2011, the second island, Jadid, emerged in September 2013.

Oilfields
The Durwara 2 Field was discovered in 1963, while the Suakin 1 Field and the Bashayer 1A Field were discovered in 1976, on the Egyptian side of the Red Sea. The Barqan Field was discovered in 1969, and the Midyan Field in 1992, both within the Midyan Basin on the Saudi Arabian side of the Red Sea. The 20-m thick Middle Miocene Maqna Formation is an oil source rock in the basin. Oil seeps occur near the Farasan Islands, the Dahlak Archipelago, along the coast of Eritrea, and in the southeastern Red Sea along the coasts of Saudi Arabia and Yemen.

Mineral resources

In terms of mineral resources the major constituents of the Red Sea sediments are as follows:
Biogenic constituents:
Nanofossils, foraminifera, pteropods, siliceous fossils
Volcanogenic constituents:
Tuffites, volcanic ash, montmorillonite, cristobalite, zeolites
Terrigenous constituents:
Quartz, feldspars, rock fragments, mica, heavy minerals, clay minerals
Authigenic minerals:
Sulfide minerals, aragonite, calcite, protodolomite, dolomite, quartz, chalcedony.
Evaporite minerals:
Magnesite, gypsum, anhydrite, halite, polyhalite
Brine precipitate:
Fe-montmorillonite, goethite, hematite, siderite, rhodochrosite, pyrite, sphalerite, anhydrite.

Ecosystem

The Red Sea is a rich and diverse ecosystem. More than 1200 species of fish have been recorded in the Red Sea, and around 10% of these are found nowhere else. This also includes 42 species of deepwater fish. 

The reefs form platforms and sometimes lagoons along the coast and occasional other features such as cylinders (such as the Blue Hole (Red Sea) at Dahab). These coastal reefs are also visited by pelagic species of Red Sea fish, including some of the 44 species of shark.

It contains 175 species of nudibranch, many of which are only found in the Red Sea.

The Red Sea also contains many offshore reefs including several true atolls. Many of the unusual offshore reef formations defy classic (i.e., Darwinian) coral reef classification schemes, and are generally attributed to the high levels of tectonic activity that characterize the area.

The special biodiversity of the area is recognized by the Egyptian government, who set up the Ras Mohammed National Park in 1983. The rules and regulations governing this area protect local marine life, which has become a major draw for diving enthusiasts.

Divers and snorkellers should be aware that although most Red Sea species are innocuous, a few are hazardous to humans.

Other marine habitats include sea grass beds, salt pans, mangrove and salt marsh.

Desalination plants 
There is extensive demand for desalinated water to meet the needs of the population and the industries along the Red Sea.

There are at least 18 desalination plants along the Red Sea coast of Saudi Arabia which discharge warm brine and treatment chemicals (chlorine and anti-scalants) that bleach and kill corals and cause diseases in the fish. This is only localized, but it may intensify with time and profoundly impact the fishing industry.

Trade
The Red Sea serves an important role in the global economy, with cargo vessels travelling between the Indian Ocean and the Mediterranean Sea every year, thus shortening the path between Asia and Europe almost twice (as compared to travelling around Africa via the Atlantic Ocean).

Tourism

The sea is known for its recreational diving sites, such as Ras Mohammed, SS Thistlegorm (shipwreck), Elphinstone Reef, The Brothers, Daedalus Reef, St.John's Reef, Rocky Island in Egypt and less known sites in Sudan such as Sanganeb, Abington, Angarosh and Shaab Rumi.

The Red Sea became a popular destination for diving after the expeditions of Hans Hass in the 1950s, and later by Jacques-Yves Cousteau. Popular tourist resorts include El Gouna, Hurghada, Safaga, Marsa Alam, on the west shore of the Red Sea, and Sharm-el-Sheikh, Dahab, and Taba on the Egyptian side of Sinaï, as well as Aqaba in Jordan and Eilat in Israel in an area known as the Red Sea Riviera.

The popular tourist beach of Sharm el-Sheikh was closed to all swimming in December 2010 due to several serious shark attacks, including a fatality. As of December 2010, scientists are investigating the attacks and have identified, but not verified, several possible causes including over-fishing which causes large sharks to hunt closer to shore, tourist boat operators who chum offshore for shark-photo opportunities, and reports of ships throwing dead livestock overboard. The sea's narrowness, significant depth, and sharp drop-offs, all combine to form a geography where large deep-water sharks can roam in hundreds of meters of water, yet be within a hundred meters of swimming areas. The Red Sea Project is building highest quality accommodation and a wide range of facilities on the coast line in Saudi Arabia. This will allow people to visit the coastline of the Red Sea by the end of 2022 but will be fully finished by 2030.

Tourism to the region has been threatened by occasional terrorist attacks, and by incidents related to food safety standards.

Security
The Red Sea is part of the sea roads between Europe, the Persian Gulf and East Asia, and as such has heavy shipping traffic. Government-related bodies with responsibility to police the Red Sea area include the Port Said Port Authority, Suez Canal Authority and Red Sea Ports Authority of Egypt, Jordan Maritime Authority, Israel Port Authority, Saudi Ports Authority and Sea Ports Corporation of Sudan.

Bordering countries

The Red Sea may be geographically divided into three sections: the Red Sea proper, and in the north, the Gulf of Aqaba and the Gulf of Suez. The six countries bordering the Red Sea proper are:

Eastern shore:
Saudi Arabia
Yemen
Western shore:
Egypt
Sudan
Eritrea
Djibouti

The Gulf of Suez is entirely bordered by Egypt. The Gulf of Aqaba borders Egypt, Israel, Jordan and Saudi Arabia.

In addition to the standard geographical definition of the six countries bordering the Red Sea cited above, areas such as Somaliland are sometimes also described as Red Sea territories. This is primarily due to their proximity to and geological similarities with the nations facing the Red Sea and/or political ties with said areas.

Towns and cities
Towns and cities on the Red Sea coast (including the coasts of the Gulfs of Aqaba and Suez) include:

Al Hudaydah, Yemen (الحديدة)
Al Lith, Saudi Arabia (الليِّث)
Al Qunfudhah, Saudi Arabia (القنفذة)
Al-Qusair, Egypt (القصير)
Al Wajh, Saudi Arabia (الوجه)
Aqaba, Jordan (العقبة)
Asseb, Eritrea (ዓሰብ / عصب)
Dahab, Egypt (دهب)
Duba, Saudi Arabia (ضباء)
Eilat, Israel (אילת)
El Gouna, Egypt (الجونة)
El Suweis, Egypt (السويس)
Hala'ib, Egypt and Sudan (حلايب) (disputed)
Haql, Saudi Arabia (حقل)
Hirgigo, Eritrea (ሕርጊጎ / حرقيقو)
Hurghada, Egypt (الغردقة)
Jeddah, Saudi Arabia (جدة)
Jazan, Saudi Arabia (جازان)
Marsa Alam, Egypt (مرسى علم)
Massawa, Eritrea (ምጽዋዕ / مصوع)
Moulhoule, Djibouti (مول هولة) 
Nuweiba, Egypt (نويبع)
Port Safaga, Egypt (ميناء سفاجا)
Port Sudan, Sudan (بورت سودان)
Rabigh, Saudi Arabia (رابغ)
Sharm el Sheikh, Egypt (شرم الشيخ)
Soma Bay, Egypt (سوما باي)
Suakin, Sudan (سواكن)
Taba, Egypt (طابا)
Thuwal, Saudi Arabia (ثول)
Yanbu, Saudi Arabia (ينبع)

Facts and figures 

Length: ~ – 79% of the eastern Red Sea with numerous coastal inlets
Maximum Width: ~ – Massawa (Eritrea)
Minimum Width: ~ – Bab el Mandeb Strait (Yemen)
Average Width: ~
Average Depth: ~
Maximum Depth: ~
Surface Area: 
Volume: 

About 15% of the Red Sea is over  depth that forms the deep axial trough.
Shelf breaks are marked by coral reefs
Continental slope has an irregular profile (series of steps down to ~)
Centre of Red Sea has a narrow trough (Suakin Trough) (~; with maximum depth )

See also

Benjamin Kahn
 ferry disaster
Crossing the Red Sea, a Biblical tale from the Book of Exodus
Red Sea Dam
Robert Moresby

References

Further reading
 

Miran, Jonathan. (2018). "The Red Sea," in David Armitage, Alison Bashford and Sujit Sivasundaram (eds.), Oceanic Histories (Cambridge: Cambridge University Press), pp. 156–181.

External links

Red Sea Coral Reefs
Red Sea Photography

 
Tourist attractions in Egypt
Egypt–Sudan border
Eritrea–Sudan border
Great Rift Valley
Marine ecoregions
Saudi Arabia–Yemen border
Suez Canal
Underwater diving sites
Marginal seas of the Indian Ocean
Gulfs of the Indian Ocean
Geography of East Africa
Geography of North Africa
Geography of the Middle East
Geography of Western Asia
Horn of Africa
Seas of Africa
Seas of Asia
Bodies of water of Egypt
Bodies of water of Eritrea
Bodies of water of Israel
Bodies of water of Jordan
Bodies of water of Saudi Arabia
Bodies of water of Sudan
Seas of Yemen
Inlets of Asia
Articles containing video clips